The following is a list of mayors (alcaldes) of Madrid since 1803.

Mayors from 1803 to 1931
 José Urbina, 1803–1805
 José de Marquina Galindo, 1805–1808
 Pedro de Mora y Lomas, 1808–1810
 Dámaso de la Torre, 1810–1811
 Manuel García de la Prada, 1811–1812
 Juan Antonio Pico, 1812
 Marqués de Iturvieta, 1812 and 1813
 Conde de Villapaterna, 1812
 Pedro Sainz de Baranda y Gorriti, 1812, 1813 and 1820
 Magín Ferrer, 1812
 Frutos Álvarez Benito, 1812
 Conde de Moctezuma, 1814
 Juan de Mata Garro Robles, marqués de las Hormazas 1814–1816
 José Manuel de Arjona, 1816–1820
 Rodrigo de Aranda, 1820–1822
 Félix Ovalle, 1820
 José Pío de Molina, 1820–1821, 1823
 Conde de Clavijo, 1821
 Conde de Goyeneche, 1821–1822
 Marqués de Santa Cruz, 1822
 Ramón Casella, 1822
 Cayetano Rubio, 1822
 Miguel Nájera, 1822
 Arias Gonzalo de Mendoza, 1822–1823
 Luis Beltrán de Leo, 1823
 Joaquín Lorenzo Mozo, 1824
 León de la Cámara Cano, 1824–1828
 Tadeo Ignacio Gil, 1828–1830
 Domingo María de Barrafón, 1830–1834
 Marqués de Falces, 1834–1835
 José María Galdeano, 1835
 Marqués de Pontejos, 1835–1836
 Juan Losaña, 1836
 José María Basualdo, 1837
 Juan Bautista del Llano, 1837
 Victor López Molina, 1838
 Manuel Ruiz Oganio, 1838
 Tomás Fernández Vallejo, 1839
 Luis Oseñalde, 1839
 Salustiano Olózaga, 1840
 Joaquín María Ferrer, 1840
 Francisco Javier Ferro Mateo, 1840
 Marqués de Peñaflorida, 1842–1845
 Juan Álvarez Mendizálbal, 1843
 Ignacio de Olea, 1843–1854
 Jacinto Félix Doménech, 1843
 Manuel de Larraín, 1843–1844
 Marqués de Someruelos, 1844–1847
 Manuel de Bárbara, 1844
 Duque de Veragua, 1845–1846
 José Laplana, 1846
 Conde de Vistahermosa, 1847
 Marqués de Santa Cruz, 1848–1851
 Luis Piernas, 1851–1852
 Conde de Quinto, 1852, 1853–1854
 José Seco Baldor, 1854
 Valentín Ferraz, 1855–1856
 Jacobo Fitz-James Stuart, 15th Duke of Alba, 1857
 Carlos Marfori y Callejas, 1857
 José Osorio y Silva, Duque de Sesto 1857–1864
 Duque de Tamames, 1864
 Conde de Puñonrostro, 1864
 Conde de Belascoáin, 1864–1865
 José Ramón Osorio, 1865
 Marqués de San Saturnino, 1865–1866
 Marqués de Villaseca, 1866–1867
 Marqués de Villamagna, 1867
 Marqués Viudo de Villar, 1867–1868
 Nicolás María Rivero, 1868–1870
 Manuel María José de Galdo, 1870
 Fernando Hidalgo Saavedra, 1870–1872
 Marqués de Sardoal, 1872–1874
 Carlos María Ponte, 1872
 Simeón Avalos, 1872–1873
 Pedro Menéndez Vega, 1873
 Pedro Bernardo Uncasitas, 1873–1874
 Francisco de Borja Queipo de Llano y Gayoso de los Cobos, VIII Conde de Toreno, 1874–1875
 Conde de Heredia Spinola, 1875–1877
 Marqués de Torneros, 1877–1881
 José Abascal y Carredano, 1881–1883, 1885–1889
 Marqués de Urquijo, 1883
 Gonzalo de Saavedra y Cueto, 1884–1885
 Alberto Bosch y Fustegueras, 1885, 1891–1892
 Andrés Mellado, 1889–1890
 Cayetano Sánchez Bustillo, 1890
 Narciso García-Loygorri, Duque de Vistahermosa, 1890
 Faustino Rodríguez San Pedro, 1890–1891
 Marqués de Cubas, 1892
 , conde de Peñalver 1892, 1895–1896, 1907–1909
 Manuel de Mariátegui, 1st Count of San Bernardo, 1892–1893
 Santiago Angulo, 1893–1894
 Conde de Romanones, 1894–1895, 1897–1899
 Conde de Montarco, 1896
 Joaquín Sánchez de Toca, 1896–1897, 1907
 Ventura García-Sancho, Marquis of Aguilar de Campoo, 1899–1900
 Manuel Allendesalazar, 1900
Mariano Fernández de Henestrosa Mioño, duque de Santo Mauro (1900–1901)
Alberto Aguilera y Velasco (1901–1902)
Vicente Cabeza de Vaca y Fernández de Córdoba, marqués de Portazgo (1902–1903)
Salvador Bermúdez de Castro y O'Lawlor, marqués de Lema (1903– 1904)
Gonzalo de Figueroa y Torres, conde de Mejorada del Campo y marqués de Villamejor (1904–1905)
 (1905–1906)
Alberto Aguilera y Velasco (1906–1907)
Eduardo Dato e Iradier (1907–1907)
Joaquín Sánchez de Toca (1907–1907)
, conde de Peñalver (1907–1909)
Alberto Aguilera y Velasco (1909–1910)
José Francos Rodríguez (1910–1912)
 (1912–1913)
 (1913–1913)
Luis Marichalar y Monreal, vizconde de Eza (1913–1914)
Carlos Prats y Rodríguez de Llano (1914–1915)
José del Prado y Palacios (1915–1915)
 (1915–1916)
Martín Rosales Martel, duque de Almodóvar del Valle (1916–1917)
Luis Silvela Casado (1917–1917)
José Francos Rodríguez (1917–1918)
 (1918–1918)
Luis Garrido Juaristi (1918–1920)
Ramón Rivero de Miranda, conde de Limpias (1920–1921)
Alfredo Serrano Jover (1921–1921)
Álvaro de Figueroa y Alonso Martínez, marqués de Villabrágima (1921–1922)
José María Garay, conde del Valle Suchil (1922–1922)
 (1922–1923)
Faustino Nicoli (1923–1923)
Alberto Alcocer y Ribacoba (1923–1924)
Conde de Vallellano (1924–1925)
José del Prado Palacio (1925–1927)
Emilio Antón (1927–1927)
Manuel Semprún y Pombo(1927–1927)
Rafael Carlos Gordon Arístegui, conde de Mirasol, (1927–1927)
José María de Aristizábal Manchón (1927–1930)
José María de Hoyos y Vinent de la Torre O'Neill, marqués de Hoyos (1930–1931)

Mayors since 1931

Notes

See also
Madrid
History of Madrid
Timeline of Madrid

External links
 Lista completa de alcaldes de Madrid
Alcaldes de Madrid. Desde las elecciones municipales de 1979

Timeline since 1979

History of Madrid
Madrid

Mayors